Xanthia tatago, the pink-barred sallow, is a species of cutworm or dart moth in the family Noctuidae. It is found in North America.

The MONA or Hodges number for Xanthia tatago is 9965.

References

Further reading

 
 
 

Xylenini
Articles created by Qbugbot
Moths described in 2003